Lisi Potok is a river of Poland, a tributary of the Trawna.

Tributaries
Bukowa Woda

See also
List of rivers of Poland

References

Rivers of Poland